Jacob Ford (born July 20, 1983 in Memphis, Tennessee) is a former American football defensive end. He was originally selected by the Tennessee Titans as the 204th overall pick in the 6th round of the 2007 NFL Draft. He played college football at Central Arkansas. PRO: Now in his fifth NFL season, former sixth-round draft pick Jacob Ford is one of the most established pass rushers on the squad.  From 2008 through 2010, no other Titans defender had more than Ford’s 15.5 total sacks.  The athletically-gifted Ford was one of the fastest defensive ends available in the 2007 rookie pool, but his talents were only briefly on display for the Titans before a left Achilles’ injury in his first training camp resulted in his placement on injured reserve.  He returned from the injury in 2008 to post seven sacks and followed that with a team-high 5.5 sacks in 2009 and three sacks in 2010.

Early years 
At Melrose High School (Memphis, Tennessee) earned All-Shelby Metro, Prep Star All-Southeast Region and High Tech Tennessee's Top Prospect List honors as senior two-way lineman. He registered 229 tackles and 32 sacks during career and helped team win 1998 State Championship. He also ran track three seasons.

College career 
In two seasons at Central Arkansas, Ford totaled 102 tackles, 17 sacks and 32.5 tackles for loss. As a senior (2006), he was named Division II First-team All-American by College Sports Report after starting all 10 games and leading the team with eight sacks and 15.5 tackles for loss. He added 48 tackles, four passes defensed, three forced fumbles and one fumble recovery.
As a junior (2005) at Central Arkansas, he was named first-team All-Gulf South Conference, First-team All-Region and Second-
team All-American after starting all 14 games for Bears team that made NCAA Division II quarterfinals. As a sophomore (2004) at Holmes Community College (Goodman, Miss.), Ford played nine games and earned All-State honors. Ford was not enrolled in college during 2002 and 2003 seasons. As a freshman (2001) at Memphis, earned Freshman All-Conference USA honors after appearing in 10 games.

Professional career

Pre-draft
At the 2007 NFL combine, Ford ran the 40-yard dash in 4.68 seconds, the second-best time among defensive ends, and bench pressed 225 pounds 19 times.

Tennessee Titans
He was originally selected by the Tennessee Titans as the 204th overall pick in the 6th round of the 2007 NFL Draft. In 2007 Ford injured his left Achilles’ tendon in practice on August 13, 2007 and was placed on injured reserve a week later. The next season, 2008, Ford played 14 games with three starts and totaled 26 tackles, two forced fumbles, and seven sacks. On September 3, 2011 the Titans cut Ford.

External links
Tennessee Titans bio

1983 births
Living people
Players of American football from Memphis, Tennessee
American football defensive ends
Tennessee Titans players
Central Arkansas Bears football players